Hugh Andrew Dysart (October 12, 1896 – January 21, 1964) was a Canadian politician. He served in the Legislative Assembly of New Brunswick from 1952 to 1964 as member of the Liberal party.

References

1896 births
1964 deaths